Lina Nerli Taviani (born 16 November 1937) is an Italian costume designer, and wife of film director Paolo Taviani.

Biography
Nerli began working as a costume designer in the 1960s and her first film work was on The Reckless directed by Giuliano Montaldo.

Since then, she has created costumes for over seventy films and television productions, most of which directed by her husband and her brother-in-laws Paolo and Vittorio Taviani.

Partial filmography

 The Reckless (1965)
 Requiescant (1967)
 Il seme dell'uomo (1969)
 Under the Sign of Scorpio (1969)
 Lettera aperta a un giornale della sera (1970)
 Wind from the East (1970)
 Corbari (1970)
 L'udienza (1972)
 St. Michael Had a Rooster (1972)
 The Grand Duel (1972)
 Don't Touch the White Woman! (1974)
 Allonsanfàn (1974)
 A Sold Life (1976)
 Quanto è bello lu murire acciso (1976)
 Sahara Cross (1977)
 Padre Padrone (1977)
 Ecce bombo (1978)
 La Luna (1979)
 The Meadow (1979)
 Men or Not Men (1980)
 Tragedy of a Ridiculous Man (1981)
 The Night of the Shooting Stars (1982)
 Blow to the Heart (1982)
 Nostalghia (1983)
 The House of the Yellow Carpet (1983)
 Henry IV (1984)
 Kaos (1984)
 My Dearest Son (1985)
 A Tale of Love (1986)
 Devil in the Flesh (1986)
 Good Morning, Babylon (1987)
 The Rogues (1987)
 Private Access (1988)
 Cavalli si nasce (1988)
 I ragazzi di via Panisperna (1989)
 The Secret (1990)
 The Sun Also Shines at Night (1990)
 Rossini! Rossini! (1991)
 Parenti serpenti (1992)
 Fiorile (1993)
 Il toro (1994)
 Dear Goddamned Friends (1994)
 The Second Time (1996)
 The Elective Affinities (1996)
 Vesna Goes Fast (1996)
 You Laugh (1998)
 Holy Tongue (2000)
  Accidental Detective (2003)
 Lavorare con lentezza (2004)
 The Caiman (2006)
 The Lark Farm (2007)
 Civico zero (2007)
 We Have a Pope (2011)
 Long Live Freedom (2013)
 Cha cha cha (2013)
 Wondrous Boccaccio (2015)
 Rainbow: A Private Affair (2017)

Awards

David di Donatello Awards
 1983: Nomination for Best Costume Design for The Night of the Shooting Stars
 1992: Best Costume Design for Rossini! Rossini! 
 1993: Nomination for Best Costume Design for Fiorile
 1997: Nomination for Best Costume Design for The Elective Affinities
 2006: Nomination for Best Costume Design for The Caiman 
 2007: Nomination for Best Costume Design for The Lark Farm 
 2012: Best Costume Design for We Have a Pope
 2015: Nomination for Best Costume Design for Wondrous Boccaccio

Nastro d'Argento Awards
 1988: Best Costume Design for Good Morning, Babylon
 1993: Best Costume Design for Parenti serpenti
 1994: Nomination for Best Costume Design for Fiorile
 1997: Nomination for Best Costume Design for The Elective Affinities
 1999: Nomination for Best Costume Design for You Laugh
 2007: Nomination for Best Costume Design for The Lark Farm
 2011: Best Costume Design for We Have a Pope

References

External links
 

Living people
Italian costume designers
Italian designers
People from Pisa
1937 births
Women costume designers
Ciak d'oro winners